Aymard is a French given name.

Nobility 
 Count Aymard d'Ursel
 Aymar de Lairon

Saints 
 Aymard of Cluny

Others 
 Aymard Moro Mvé

French masculine given names
French-language surnames